The Zakatal okrug was a special administrative district (okrug) of the Caucasus Viceroyalty of the Russian Empire, part of the Tiflis Governorate from 1893 to 1905. The administrative centre of the district was Zakataly (present-day Zaqatala), and it corresponded to most of the contemporary districts of Balakan, Zaqatala and Qax of Azerbaijan. The Zakatal okrug was established from the territories of the erstwhile Free Jamaats of Jar-Balakan, bordering the Tiflis Governorate to the west, the Elizavetpol Governorate to the south and the Dagestan Oblast to the north. The district was the smallest independent (not part of any province or region) administrative unit of the Russian Empire, similarly to the Sukhumi okrug.

History 
The district was originally established under the name Belokan in 1842, within the Georgia-Imeretia Governorate, two years after it was renamed to Jaro-Belokan. The autonomous status of the district was confirmed in 1846, leading to its renaming to Zakataly in 1860 and its placement into the temporary administration of Dagestan during which its administration was organised into a military council, of which the chief was the head of the district, concurrently with Dagestan. In 1881, an independent administration was introduced. The Zakatal okrug was incorporated into the 'civilian' administration of the Tiflis Governorate from 1893 until 1905 when was removed and placed directly under the Viceroy of the Caucasus.

The social structure of the Zakatal okrug was multi-layered in its patriarchal-clans which were involved in "mountain feudalism", which became muddled by growing ethno-nationalism and the social differences they bore. The Free Jamaats (Society) peoples were the collective owners of the lands in which the Ingiloys and Tatars (later Azerbaijanis) lived, for which the latter paid tax to them. In 1863, a rumor circulated that the administration of Zakataly was planning to emancipate the Georgians and Tatars from their financial obligations to the Free Jamaats peoples, leading to an anti-Russian uprising of its Dagestani inhabitants. The uprising became elevated by the declaration of jihad (holy war) until its suppression by local troops assisted by Tatar volunteers.

Following the Russian Revolution, most of the district was incorporated into the Azerbaijan Democratic Republic and transformed into the Zaqatala Governorate, despite also being claimed by the neighboring Democratic Republic of Georgia. On account of the dispute, the authorities of both states agreed to resolve the territorial dispute over Zakatal strictly by peaceful means. A few hundred Armenians remained in the district by 1919 and were harassed by outlaws.

Despite the Russian SFSR initially recognising the Zakatal okrug as part of Georgia in the Treaty of Moscow, a mixed commission consisting of Georgians and Azerbaijanis was formed to arbitrate the dispute following the region's sovietisation. During the administrative-territorial reforms of the 1920s, the Zakataly district was separated into the raions of Balakan, Zagatala, and Gakh.

Economy 
The main occupations of the predominantly Sunni population included cattle breeding, agriculture, viticulture, picking fruits (mainly walnuts), handicrafts and silkworm breeding.

Administrative divisions 
The subcounties (uchastoks) of the Zakatal okrug in 1913 were as follows:

There once existed a Gornye magaly ("mountain quarters") district "along the headwaters of the Samur", however, it was removed in 1860. There was also a Belokanskiy uchastok before 1912.

Demographics

Russian Empire Census 
The plurality of the population indicated Avar-Andean to be their mother tongue, with significant Tatar, Georgian, and Dargin speaking minorities.

Kavkazskiy kalendar 

Notes

References

Bibliography 

Caucasus Viceroyalty (1801–1917)
Oblasts of the Russian Empire
Tiflis Governorate
Modern history of Azerbaijan
19th century in Azerbaijan